The C-1 is a rail service of Cercanías Madrid commuter rail network, operated by Renfe Operadora. It runs from Príncipe Pío station in western Madrid to Madrid Barajas Airport Terminal 4, through the city center of Madrid. The service has existed in its current form since 2011, when it opened.

Infrastructure
Like the rest of Cercanías Madrid services, the C-1 runs on the Iberian gauge mainline railway system, which is owned by Adif, an agency of the Spanish government. All of the railway lines carrying Rodalies de Catalunya services are electrified at 3,000 volts (V) direct current (DC) using overhead lines. The trains on the line call at up to 11 stations, using the following railway lines, in order from north to south:

List of stations
The following table lists the name of each station served by C-1 in order from west to east; the station's service pattern offered by C-1 trains; the transfers to other Cercanías Madrid lines; remarkable transfers to other transport systems; the municipality in which each station is located; and the fare zone each station belongs to according to the Madrid Metro fare zone system.

References

Cercanías Madrid